The Faroese Scientific Society, was founded in 1952 with the objective of promoting co-operation in all fields of learning, collecting scientific literature, and publishing the results of research on or carried out in the Faroe Islands. A yearly periodical, Fróðskaparrit, came to be published annually. It was through the work of the society that the University of the Faroe Islands came to be founded.

See also
Education in the Faroe Islands
University of the Faroe Islands

References

External links
 Føroya Fróðskaparfelag Website

Faroese culture
Scientific organizations established in 1952